The 1930 United States Senate election in Arkansas took place on November 4, 1930. Incumbent Democratic Senator Joseph Taylor Robinson was re-elected to a fourth term in office. He defeated Tom W. Campbell in the Democratic primary.

Because the Republican Party (or any other party) did not field a candidate in the general election, Robinson's primary victory was tantamount to election.

Democratic primary

Candidates
Tom W. Campbell
Joseph Taylor Robinson, incumbent Senator since 1913 and 1928 Democratic nominee for Vice President of the United States

Results

General election

Results
Robinson was unopposed for re-election.

See also
1930 United States Senate elections

References 

1930
Arkansas
United States Senate
Single-candidate elections